David Arnold Simonson (born May 2, 1952) is a former professional American football player who played in four National Football League (NFL) seasons, from 1974 to 1977, for the five different teams.

References

1952 births
Living people
People from Austin, Minnesota
Players of American football from Minnesota
American football offensive tackles
Minnesota Golden Gophers football players
Baltimore Colts players
New York Giants players
Houston Oilers players
Seattle Seahawks players
Detroit Lions players